Roger Tréville (17 November 1902, in Paris – 27 September 2005, in Beaumont-du-Périgord) was a French actor. He was born as Roger Troly; his parents, Georges Tréville (1875–1944) and Fanny Delisle (1881–1969), were also stage and film actors.

Selected filmography
 The Rotters (1921)
 Married Life (1921)
 Sinister Street (1922)
 My Childish Father (1930)
 Venetian Nights (1931)
 His Highness Love (1931)
 Durand Versus Durand (1931)
 You Will Be My Wife (1932)
 Abduct Me (1932)
 Beauty Spot (1932)
 Bach the Millionaire (1933)
 Speak to Me of Love (1935)
 Jacques and Jacotte (1936)
 The Porter from Maxim's (1939)
 Brilliant Waltz (1949)
 The Green Glove (1952)
 Stopover in Orly (1955)
 The Bride Is Much Too Beautiful (1956)
 The Happy Road (1957)
 Ponzio Pilato (1962)
 How to Steal a Million (1966)

References

External links
 

1902 births
2005 deaths
French centenarians
French male film actors
French male silent film actors
Male actors from Paris
Men centenarians
20th-century French male actors